Wateree is an unincorporated community in Richland County, in the U.S. state of South Carolina.

History
A post office called Wateree was established in 1852, and remained in operation until 1963. The community was named after the Wateree people.

References

Unincorporated communities in Richland County, South Carolina